The Armagh Championship Tournament  or Armagh ALTC Championship was a combined men's and women's Hard court tennis tournament staged first staged on 28 September 1878 as the Armagh Lawn Tennis Tournament at the Archery and Lawn Tennis Club, Armagh, Northern Ireland. The championship was staged up to at least 1934.

History
The Armagh Lawn Tennis Tournament was a late Victorian period tennis tournament that was played on hard courts (one of the earliest known). The tournament was organised by the  Archery and Lawn Tennis Club in Armagh, Northern Ireland. This tournament was particularly unique, not for it just being a hard court event, it also staged combined events for men and women in both singles, doubles and mixed doubles. However they were not all held at the same time the events were spread out over a three-month period, being played July through to October.

At the inaugural 1878 tournament only a men's singles event was played, that was won by Walter Francis Templer, the brother of Robert Baron Templer. On 27 July 1882, the Armagh LTC Tournament was concluded that fetured a women's singles, doubles and mixed soubles event. The women's singles was won by Miss J M McLintock. The women's doubles event was won by Miss. G McLintock and Miss J M Mclintock, and the mixed double's was won by Major Dashwood and Miss J M Mclintock. In October 1882 a second Armagh LTC Tournament was held for the men's singles event that was held won by Robert Barron Templer.

The tournament continued to staged throughout the 1880s and 1890s.  
The tournament continued to be held throughout the 1920s, and into the early 1930s which by this point it was known as the Armagh Championship Tournament.

References

Sources
 Belfast News Letter (25 June 1934). Belfast, Antrim, Northern Ireland: British Newspaper Archives. 
 Dublin Daily Express. (5 September 1888). Dublin, Republic of Ireland: British Newspaper Archives.
 Irish Times.(10 July 1891). Dublin, Ireland: British Newspaper Archives. 
 Northern Whig and Belfast Post (14 June 1923). British Newspaper Archives.
 Routledge Sporting Annual (1883) Results for 1882. George Routledge and Son's. London. England.

Defunct tennis tournaments in the United Kingdom
Hard court tennis tournaments